Marnie Elizabeth McBean,  (born January 28, 1968) is a Canadian former rower. She is a three-time Olympics gold medallist.

Rowing career
A graduate of the University of Western Ontario, McBean competed at the 1992 Summer Olympics in the coxless pairs and eights events, winning gold medals in both.  At the 1996 Summer Olympics she competed in the double and quadruple sculls, winning gold in the double and bronze in the quadruple. With her long-time rowing partner Kathleen Heddle, she was the first Canadians to win three Olympic Gold medals. In addition to her other exploits, McBean won a Silver medal in the prestigious single scull event at the 1993 World Rowing Championships.

At the 2000 Sydney Olympics, McBean was set to represent Canada in the single scull and she had hoped to win a fourth gold medal.  After travelling to Australia, a back injury which eventually required an operation forced McBean to withdraw from the Olympics and McBean decided to retire from international competition.

Accolades and personal life
In 1997, McBean was inducted into the Canadian Sports Hall of Fame. In 2002, McBean was awarded the Thomas Keller Medal by FISA, the International Rowing Federation, for her outstanding career in international rowing. In 1997, she was awarded the Meritorious Service Medal (civil division). In 2013, she was made an Officer of the Order of Canada. She has been appointed as chef de mission of Canada's team at the 2020 Olympic Games, to be held in Tokyo.

After retiring from active competition, McBean began coming out as lesbian in her personal life. She met her partner Deanah Shelly in 2010, and the couple married in April 2014. They have a daughter named Isabel.

In 2015, McBean was presented the Bonham Centre Award from The Mark S. Bonham Centre for Sexual Diversity Studies, University of Toronto, for her contributions to the advancement and education of issues around sexual identification.

References

External links
 
 
 
 

1968 births
Living people
Medalists at the 1992 Summer Olympics
Canadian female rowers
Canadian people of Scottish descent
Officers of the Order of Canada
Olympic bronze medalists for Canada
Olympic gold medalists for Canada
Olympic rowers of Canada
Rowers from Vancouver
Recipients of the Meritorious Service Decoration
Rowers at the 1992 Summer Olympics
Rowers at the 1996 Summer Olympics
University of Western Ontario alumni
Olympic medalists in rowing
Medalists at the 1996 Summer Olympics
Canadian LGBT sportspeople
Lesbian sportswomen
Pan American Games gold medalists for Canada
Pan American Games medalists in rowing
Thomas Keller Medal recipients
Rowers at the 1999 Pan American Games
LGBT rowers
Medalists at the 1999 Pan American Games